Dara Huang (born 1982/1983) is an American architect. In 2013, she founded the architecture and design firm Design Haus Liberty. She is the co-founder of Vivahouse, which converts disused commercial properties into co-living spaces.

Early life 
Huang was born in Florida to Taiwanese immigrants. Her father is a retired NASA rocket scientist. She attended the University of Florida, from which she graduated in 2004 with a Bachelor of Arts in design. She was a member of Alpha Delta Pi sorority. She earned a master's degree in architecture from Harvard University.

Career 
After graduating, Huang worked at architectural firms Herzog & de Meuron in Switzerland and Foster and Partners in London. At these firms she worked on several large projects, including the skyscraper 56 Leonard Street in New York City, Tate Modern in London, and Manolo Blahnik stores around the world.

Huang has received several awards, including The Clifford Wong Prize, The KPF Travelling Fellowship, The Young Architects Award, and first place in the AIAS National Design Review.

Design Haus Liberty 

In 2013, Huang opened her own architecture practice, Design Haus Liberty, in Clerkenwell, London. Its work has been exhibited at Somerset House in London and the Venice Biennale of Architecture.

Personal life 
Huang was engaged to Edoardo Mapelli Mozzi, with whom she has a son. The engagement was broken off in 2018.

Huang is a survivor of the 2008 Mumbai attacks. She and her then boyfriend John Fesko were at the Leopold Cafe when the terrorist started shooting.

Huang became a British citizen in January 2022.

References 

1980s births
21st-century American architects
21st-century American businesspeople
21st-century American businesswomen
21st-century British architects
21st-century British businesspeople
21st-century British businesswomen
American people of Taiwanese descent
American construction businesspeople
American emigrants to England
American expatriates in Hong Kong
American expatriates in Japan
American expatriates in Switzerland
American women architects
Architects from Florida
British construction businesspeople
British people of Taiwanese descent
British women architects
Businesspeople from Florida
Harvard University alumni
Living people
People with acquired British citizenship
University of Florida alumni
Year of birth missing (living people)
Survivors of the 2008 Mumbai attacks